Nipponidion yaeyamense is a species of comb-footed spider in the family Theridiidae. It is found in Japan.

References

Theridiidae
Spiders described in 1993